Robert Mandel "Bob" Sutton (April 27, 1911 – September 13, 1977) was an American sailor who competed in the 1932 Summer Olympics.

In 1932 he was a crew member of the American boat Angelita which won the gold medal in the 8 metre class.

References

External links
 
 
 

1911 births
1977 deaths
American male sailors (sport)
Olympic gold medalists for the United States in sailing
Sailors at the 1932 Summer Olympics – 8 Metre
Sailors at the 1936 Summer Olympics – 8 Metre
Medalists at the 1932 Summer Olympics